Adrian Owen Breen (born January 11, 1965) is a former American football quarterback in the National Football League. He played for the Cincinnati Bengals,  and college football for the Morehead State Eagles.

Adrian is currently the President and CEO of the Bank of Missouri.

References

1965 births
Living people
American football quarterbacks
Cincinnati Bengals players
Morehead State Eagles football players
Players of American football from New York City
National Football League replacement players